Liberty Hall, also known as Armstrong's Lott, is a historic home located at Westover, Somerset County, Maryland, United States. It is a -story house that sits on a high brick foundation.

Liberty Hall was listed on the National Register of Historic Places in 1976.

References

External links
, including photo from 1986, at Maryland Historical Trust

Houses in Somerset County, Maryland
Houses on the National Register of Historic Places in Maryland
Houses completed in 1783
National Register of Historic Places in Somerset County, Maryland